SM U-12 or U-XII was a  or U-boat built for and operated by the Austro-Hungarian Navy before and during the First World War.

SS-3 was laid down in 1909. Whitehead tried selling SS-3 to several different navies, but she was bought by the Austro-Hungarian Navy after the outbreak of World War I, despite having been rejected by them twice before. She was commissioned as U-12 in August 1914.

The submarine sank only one ship, a Greek cargo ship in May 1915, but she had earlier captured six Montenegrin sailing vessels as prizes in March. U-12 also damaged, but did not sink, the French battleship  in December 1914. While searching for targets in the vicinity of Venice in August 1915, U-12 struck a mine that blew her stern off, and sank with all hands, becoming the first Austro-Hungarian submarine sunk in the war. Her wreck was salvaged the next year by the Italians, who interred U-12s crewmen in a Venetian cemetery.

Design and construction 
SS-3 was built on speculation by Whitehead & Co. of Fiume. SS-3 was laid down in 1909 and launched at Fiume on 14 March 1911.

SS-3s featured a single-hull with a tear-drop shaped body that bore a strong resemblance to modern nuclear submarines. She displaced  surfaced, and  submerged. Her two  bow torpedo tubes featured unique, cloverleaf-shaped design hatches that rotated on a central axis, and the boat was designed to carry up to four torpedoes.

According to one source, SS-3 was initially propelled by a pair of electric motors for surface running, but had them replaced with twin 6-cylinder gasoline engines of  each when they proved disappointing during trials. It is not specifically reported for U-12, but the other U-5-class boats both suffered from inadequate ventilation, which resulted in frequent intoxication of the crew from the engine exhaust. SS-3s underwater propulsion was by two electric motors that totaled .

Career 
After SS-3s March 1911 launch, Whitehead tried to sell SS-3 to the Austro-Hungarian Navy, but because the evaluation of the first two U-5-class boats was still underway, they declined to purchase. Over the next three years Whitehead attempted to sell the boat to the navies of Peru, Portugal, the Netherlands, Brazil, and Bulgaria, before the Austro-Hungarian Navy rejected an offer for the second time. With the outbreak of war, however, the Austro-Hungarian Navy purchased the unsold submarine to quickly bolster its fleet.
Although provisionally assigned the designation U-7, the submarine was commissioned as SM U-12 on 21 August 1914, with Linienschiffsleutnant Egon Lerch in command. U-12s activities over the early part of the war are not reported, but the boat's armament was augmented by a /23 quick-firing (QF) deck gun in November 1914. Sister boat U-5 had her first radio receiver installed at the same time her deck gun was added, but it is not reported whether U-12 did as well.

On 21 December 1914, Lerch and U-12 chanced upon the French dreadnought  in the Straits of Otranto steaming at a leisurely  and unprotected by escort ships. U-12 hit French Admiral Lapeyrère's flagship with a single torpedo in the bow, destroying the battleship's wine storeroom but sparing her forward magazine. Jean Barts watertight compartments saved the ship, which made her way to Malta to undergo repairs at the British dockyards there.

U-12 survived an attack from an unknown French  on 27 February 1915. U-12s next success was the capture of two Montenegrin schooners on 22 March 1916, Fiore Di Dulcigno and Hilussie. Nine days later the U-boat captured another four Montenegrin boats, Buona Forte, Fiore I, Hailie, and Indaverdi. On 29 May, she sank the Greek steamer Virginia, which was the only ship reported sunk by U-12. In June, U-12 underwent a refit that added an additional two torpedo tubes on her forward casing.

In early August, Lerch and U-12 set out from Pola for Venice to look for enemy ships to sink. On 6 August, the Italian destroyer  rammed U-12, probably by chance, at about 05:00 in the Lido inlet of the Venetian Lagoon. Two days later, when Italian workers were dredging to try to determine the object Rosolino Pilo had hit, they heard a heavy explosion. When divers went down in the area, they discovered the wreck of U-12 with her stern blown off. U-12s entire complement of 17 men was lost when she went down. U-12 was the first Austro-Hungarian submarine sunk during the war.

In late 1916, the Italians salvaged the hulk of U-12 and transported it to Venice. The bodies of U-12s crew were interred at the San Michele cemetery in Venice, and U-12s hulk, of no salvage value, was scrapped at the Venice naval arsenal.

Summary of raiding history

Gallery

Notes

References

Bibliography 

 
 
 
 
 
 
 

U-5-class submarines
U-boats commissioned in 1914
U-boats sunk in 1915
World War I shipwrecks in the Adriatic Sea
U-boats sunk by mines
1911 ships
World War I submarines of Austria-Hungary
Maritime incidents in 1915
Ships built in Fiume